The 1934–35 Georgetown Hoyas men's basketball team represented Georgetown University during the 1934–35 NCAA college basketball season. Fred Mesmer coached it in his fourth season as head coach. The team was a member of the Eastern Intercollegiate Conference (EIC) and played its home games at Tech Gymnasium on the campus of McKinley Technical High School in Washington, D.C. The team was the least successful of Mesmers tenure, finishing with a record of 6-13 overall, 1-7 in the EIC.

Season recap

The team's star during this difficult season was senior forward Ed Hargaden, who led the Hoyas in scoring for the third straight year and in all three seasons of his varsity career. Averaging a career-high 9.2 points per game for the season, he was the first three-year scoring champion for Georgetown since the 1920-21 season. He had averaged 9.8 points per game over his collegiate career.

Hargadens son, guard Ed Hargaden Jr., would become the first second-generation Georgetown mens basketball player, playing for Georgetown on the 1957-58, 1958-59, and 1959-60 teams. The Hargadens would be the only father and son to play for the Hoyas until center Patrick Ewings son, forward Patrick Ewing Jr., joined the team in the 2006-07 season.

Roster
Sources

1934–35 schedule and results
Sources

|-
!colspan=9 style="background:#002147; color:#8D817B;"| Regular Season

References

Georgetown Hoyas men's basketball seasons
Georgetown Hoyas
Georgetown Hoyas men's basketball team
Georgetown Hoyas men's basketball team